Collected works may refer to:
 Complete works, the complete works of a single author, often edited posthumously
 Anthology (Florilegium), a collection of works by a single author or by various authors on a given topic

Literature
 Library of Congress Classification:Class A, subclass AC -- Collections - Series - Collected works, a classification used by the Library of Congress classification system

Books
 Collected Works (Bernice Summerfield anthology), a 2006 original anthology edited by Nick Wallace, featuring a spin-off character from Doctor Who
 Collected Works of Sri Aurobindo, published by the Sri Aurobindo Ashram in 1972
 Collected Works of Aleister Crowley 1905-1907, a trilogy of books published by the occultist Aleister Crowley
 Marx/Engels Collected Works (MECW), the largest collection of translations into English of the works of Karl Marx and Friedrich Engels
 The Collected Works of C. G. Jung, a multi-volume work containing the writings of psychiatrist Carl Jung
 The Collected Works of Carl Barks, a series of books containing all Disney comics and covers written and/or drawn by Carl Barks
 The Collected Works of Jeremy Bentham, a series intended to form the definitive edition of the writings of the philosopher and reformer Jeremy Bentham, currently in progress

Music
 Collected Works (music), a category of published music in print, generally containing Classical music from a past repertory

Albums
 Collected Works (Hunters & Collectors album), the first compilation album by Australian rock group, Hunters & Collectors
 Collected Works (Mike Peters album), 2001
 The Collected Works of Tourniquet, an album by the American Christian metal band Tourniquet
 Collected Works (Simon and Garfunkel album), a three-disc compilation of the 58 songs in the five Simon and Garfunkel albums
 Painkiller: The Collected Works, a four disc box set that contains previously released albums by Painkiller
 Collected Works 95–96, a collection of recordings by Masaki Batoh
 The Collected Works of the Roches, a 2003 album by The Roches
 Collected Works of Johann Christian Bach, a 48 volume edition of the music of J.C. Bach

See also
 The Collected Books of Jack Spicer (1975), first appeared in 1975, ten years after the death of Jack Spicer
 Collected Ghost Stories, a collection of stories by author Mary E. Wilkins-Freeman
 The Standard Edition of the Complete Psychological Works of Sigmund Freud, a 1956 complete edition of the works of Sigmund Freud
 Standard works, a collection of doctrines used by  The Church of Jesus Christ of Latter-day Saints
 Selected Works: 1972–1999, a compilation box set by the American band Eagles, released in 2000
 Collected (disambiguation)
 Collected Stories (disambiguation)
 Collected Poems (disambiguation)
 The Complete Works (disambiguation)
 Oeuvre (disambiguation)